Alvin Harold Carlson (born September 17, 1951) is a retired American basketball player.

Born in Oceanside, California, Carlson played collegiately for the University of Oregon.

He played for the Seattle SuperSonics (1975–76) in the National Basketball Association (NBA) for 28 games.

External links

1951 births
Living people
American expatriate basketball people in Spain
Basketball players from California
Oregon Ducks men's basketball players
Sportspeople from Oceanside, California
Seattle SuperSonics players
Undrafted National Basketball Association players
American men's basketball players
Centers (basketball)